Two human polls comprised the 1974 National Collegiate Athletic Association (NCAA) Division I football rankings. Unlike most sports, college football's governing body, the NCAA, does not bestow a national championship, instead that title is bestowed by one or more different polling agencies. There are two main weekly polls that begin in the preseason—the AP Poll and the Coaches Poll.

Legend

AP Poll

Final Coaches Poll
For the first time, the final UPI Coaches Poll was released after the bowl games, on January 2, 1975.USC received 27 of the 34 first-place votes; Michigan received four and Alabama three.

 Only 19 teams received votes
 Teams on probation were ineligible for the Coaches' poll, most notably Oklahoma (11–0).
 Prior to the 1975 season, the Big Ten and Pac-8 conferences allowed only one postseason participant each, for the Rose Bowl.

In the preceding poll in early December, Alabama was first, followed by Ohio State, Michigan, USC, and Auburn; Notre Dame was eighth.

References

College football rankings